Marie-Jeanne Rose Bertin (2 July 1747, Abbeville, Picardy, France – 22 September 1813, Épinay-sur-Seine) was a French milliner (Marchande de modes), known as the dressmaker to Queen Marie Antoinette. She was the first celebrated French fashion designer and is widely credited with having brought fashion and haute couture to the forefront of popular culture.

Biography
Rose Bertin was the daughter of Nicolas Bertin (d. 1754) and Marie-Marguerite Méquignon, and spent her childhood in St Gilles in Picardie. She came from a family of small means; her mother worked as a sick nurse, which at the time was a profession with very low salary and status, and the financial situation became even worse after the death of her father. She and her brother Jean-Laurent received a modest education, but had a high level of ambition.

Early career
At the age of sixteen, Rose Bertin moved to Paris, where she became apprenticed to a successful milliner, Mademoiselle Pagelle, with clients among the aristocracy. Bertin's early success can be attributed to her good relations with the Princesse de Conti, the Duchesse de Chartres and the Princesse de Lamballe, who would one day arrange her meeting with Marie Antoinette. After having acquired a big order for Pagelle, she became her business partner.

In 1770, Bertin opened her own dress shop, Le Grand Mogol, on the Rue Saint-Honoré with the support of the Duchesse de Chartres (it moved to 26 Rue de Richelieu in 1789). She quickly found customers among influential noble ladies at Versailles, many of whom followed her from Mademoiselle Pagelle's, including many ladies-in-waiting to the new Dauphine, Marie Antoinette.

Dressmaker to Marie Antoinette

Before Marie Antoinette arrived in France from Austria, she had been schooled in the nuances of galant spoken French and French fashions.  She was introduced to Bertin in 1772.  Twice a week, soon after Louis XVI's coronation, Bertin would present her newest creations to the queen and spend hours discussing them.  The queen adored her wardrobe and was passionate about every detail, and Bertin, as her milliner, became her confidante and friend.  Her position as the designer of the queen also secured her the position as the leading fashion designer of the French aristocracy and, as French fashion was the leader in Europe, the central figure of European fashion.

Called "Minister of Fashion" by her detractors, Bertin was the brains behind almost every new dress commissioned by the queen.  Dresses and hair became Marie Antoinette's personal vehicles of expression, and Bertin clothed the queen from 1770 until her deposition in 1792.  Bertin became a powerful figure at court, and she witnessed—and sometimes effected—profound changes in French society.  Her large, ostentatious gowns ensured that their wearer occupied at least three times as much space as her male counterpart, thus making the woman a more imposing presence.   Her creations also established France as the center of the fashion industry, and from then on, dresses made in Paris were sent to London, Venice, Vienna, Saint Petersburg and Constantinople. This inimitable Parisian elegance established the worldwide reputation of French couture.

In the mid-18th century, French women had begun to "pouf" (raise) their hair with pads and pomade and wore oversized luxurious gowns. Bertin used and exaggerated the leading modes of the day, and created poufs for Marie Antoinette with heights up to three feet.  The pouf fashion reached such extremes that it became a period trademark, along with decorating the hair with ornaments and objects which showcased current events.   Working with Léonard Autié, the queen's hairdresser, Bertin created a coiffure that became the rage all over Europe: hair would be accessorized, stylized, cut into defining scenes, and modeled into shapes and objects—ranging from recent gossip to nativities to husbands' infidelities, to French naval vessels such as the Belle Poule, to the pouf aux insurgents in honor of the American Revolutionary War.  The queen's most famous coif was the "inoculation" pouf that she wore to publicize her success in persuading the king to be vaccinated against smallpox.

Clothing had long served in France as one of the most visible markers of social privilege and aristocratic status. Antoinette was known for wearing many of the new groundbreaking fashions. Bertin came up with the idea of the chemise à la Reine or robe “en Gaulle”, a more free-flowing gown, which was initially created for Marie-Antoinette and was one of her favorite silhouettes. The dress sparked a mini-revolution and became very popular from 1781 onwards. It was a gown made to be worn in private spaces and made of white cotton, gauze, or silk. It was straight, very low cut and it was fastened with a belt around the waist, lightly accentuating the female figure. Antoinette and Bertin popularized English-inspired, sporty fashion, inspired by equestrian fashion. All the dresses were made of expensive fabrics such as silk, velvet, and very rarely cotton. It took hard work and dedication to create such masterpieces.

Marie Antoinette also asked Bertin to dress dolls in the latest fashions as gifts for her sisters and her mother, the Empress Maria Theresa of Austria. Bertin's fashion dolls were called "Pandores," and were made of wax over jointed wood armatures or porcelain.  There were small ones the size of a common toy doll, or large ones as big or half as big as a real person, petites Pandores and grandes Pandores. Fashion dolls as couriers of modes remained in vogue until the appearance of Fashion magazines.

With the queen's patronage, Bertin's name became synonymous with the sartorial elegance and excess of Versailles. Bertin's close relationship with the queen provided valuable background into the social and political significance of fashion at the French court.  The frequent meetings between the queen and her couturière were met, however, with hostility from the poorer classes, given Bertin's high prices: her gowns and headdresses could easily cost twenty times what a skilled worker of the time earned in a year.

During Marie Antoinette's imprisonment, Bertin continued to receive orders from her former prized customer, for much smaller, almost negligible ribbons and simple alterations.  She was to provide the former queen's mourning outfit following the execution of Louis XVI, recalling a dream that Marie Antoinette had had years before of her favorite milliner handing her ribbons that all turned to black.

French Revolution

The French Revolution did not immediately diminish her business despite the emigration of many of her clients abroad, and she continued to be in favor of the queen, though the bills were significantly lower.

According to Léonard Autié, he, Rose Bertin and Henriette Campan collectively contributed to the secret negotiations between the queen and Honoré Gabriel Riqueti, comte de Mirabeau by informing her about political gossip and public opinion and the fear that Mirabeau would ally himself with the Duke of Orléans. Their information allegedly convinced the queen to meet Auguste Marie Raymond d'Arenberg in the rooms of her maid Marie-Élisabeth Thibault and ask him to meet with Mirabeau in the home of Florimond Claude, Comte de Mercy-Argenteau, resulting in contact between the queen and Mirabeau.

Bertin made several journeys abroad during the Revolution, which attracted attention.  She made a trip to England and Germany in 1791–92, leading to suspicions that she was acting as Marie Antoinette's agent.  According to these speculations, she secretly visited Francis II, Holy Roman Emperor to deliver a message from Marie Antoinette, as the latter's correspondence was scrutinized and an oral message through a loyal messenger was regarded as the safest method to deliver a sensitive message across borders. This is unconfirmed, but not improbable, as the queen is confirmed to have used her hairdresser Léonard Autié as a messenger during the Flight to Varennes, and it is noted that Henriette Campan claimed that the queen managed to get secret messages to her nephew the emperor during this period. Officially, these were business trips, and Bertin is confirmed to have been in Germany in July 1791, when her presence is noted at the French émigré court in the Castle Schoenbornhut in Koblenz, where she was said to have contributed to the extravagant fashion of the women attending the court.

Bertin was absent from France during the September Massacres, which resulted in her being placed in the list of émigrés.  She managed to have herself removed from the list and returned to France in December 1792 to attend to her business.  During this stay, popular legend says she destroyed her account books in order to spare the queen from having her bills used against her during her trial. However, this does not appear to be true: all the bills of the queen prior to August 1792 were already in the possession of the government through Henry, liquidator of the civil estate, and there was at that point not yet a trial planned against Marie Antoinette. It would therefore have been pointless for Bertin to destroy her account books for that reason, and the bills of Marie Antoinette were in fact inherited by her heirs, who would demand payment of them until 1830.

In February 1793, Rose Bertin left France for London.  For a while, she was able to serve her old clients among the émigrés, and her fashion dolls continued to circulate among European capitals, as far away as Saint Petersburg.  During these years, her main income was through demanding payment of bills owed to her by her old foreign clients, such as the queen of Sweden, Sophia Magdalena of Denmark. Her business in Paris still operated, despite her absence, through representatives she appointed and money she sent to it from London, and she still delivered orders to Marie Antoinette.

Later career

In January 1795, Rose Bertin managed to have her name struck from the list of émigrés through her lawyer, who claimed that she had been absent legally since she left the country for business purposes on a legal passport from July 1792 (omitting her stay in France December 1792-February 1793), and she was thus free to return and resume her business.  She is alleged to have acted as a secret messenger for émigrés during this trip, and it is known that she provided them with funds, but this could have been merely a sign of her well-known generosity.

Her business never fully recovered, but continued on a smaller scale. This was partially because of inflation and partially because fashions changed after the French Revolution ended. Joséphine de Beauharnais was among her clients, and she had foreign clients such as Maria Theresa of Naples and Sicily (1799) and Maria Luisa of Parma (1808). She was eventually replaced as the leading fashion designer by Louis Hippolyte Leroy.

As the 19th century dawned, Bertin transferred her business to her nephews and retired to her estate in Épinay. She died in 1813 in Épinay-sur-Seine.

Famous quote

Bertin is said to have remarked to Marie Antoinette in 1785, when presenting her with a remodelled dress, "Il n'y a de nouveau que ce qui est oublié" ("There is nothing new except what has been forgotten").

See also
 Le Sieur Beaulard
 Mademoiselle Alexandre 
 Madame Eloffe
 Marie Madeleine Duchapt

References

Bibliography
Fraser, Antonia. Marie Antoinette: The Journey (London: Phoenix Press, 2006).
Guennec, Catherine. La modiste de la reine (Paris: Éditions Jean Claude Lattes, 2004).
Langlade, Émile. Rose Bertin: Creator of Fashion at the Court of Marie Antoinette (London: John Long, 1913).
Weber, Caroline. Queen of Fashion: What Marie Antoinette Wore to the Revolution (London: Aurun, 2007)

French fashion designers
French milliners
People from Abbeville
1747 births
1813 deaths
18th-century French businesswomen
18th-century French businesspeople
Household of Marie Antoinette
French women fashion designers
Haute couture